Emutbal was the name of a region in ancient Mesopotamia, located to the east of the Tigris, stretching from the ancient city of Šar-Sin to Marud. In 1834 B.C.E. Kudur-Mabuk, the Amorite king, ruled the land. In 1784 B.C.E. the country was conquered by the Babylonian king Hammurabi.

References

 
Ancient Near East
Ancient Mesopotamia
Geography of the Middle East